AFAB may refer to:

 Associação de Futebol Americano do Brasil, governs American football in Brazil
 Authority of the Freeport Area of Bataan, manages the Freeport Area of Bataan, Philippines

See also
 674th Airborne Field Artillery Battalion, former part of the US Army